Alexander Yuryevich Pavlovich (born 12 July 1988) is a Belarusian professional ice hockey player who is currently playing for Yunost Minsk in the Belarusian Extraleague. He previously played with Shakhtar Soligorsk in the Belarusian Extraleague and HC Dinamo Minsk in the Kontinental Hockey League (KHL).

He participated at the 2011 IIHF World Championship as a member of the Belarusian national team.

References

External links

1988 births
Sportspeople from Grodno
Belarusian ice hockey forwards
HC Dinamo Minsk players
Living people
HC Shakhtyor Soligorsk players
Universiade medalists in ice hockey
Universiade silver medalists for Belarus
Competitors at the 2011 Winter Universiade